Ishtiyaq is an Asian masculine given name. Notable people with the name include:

Ishtiyaq Ahmad Zilli (born 1942), Indian historian
Ishtiyaq Shukri, South African writer

Masculine given names
Asian given names